Gregory Jay Clark (April 7, 1972 – July 7, 2021) was an American professional football player who was a tight end for the San Francisco 49ers in the National Football League (NFL). He was selected by the 49ers in the third round of the 1997 NFL Draft.

Career

A 6'5", 255-lb. tight end from Stanford University, Clark played in 5 National Football League seasons and his entire career with the 49ers from 1997 to 2001. He was widely recognized as one of the premier blocking tight ends in the NFL. Clark was recruited to Stanford University as a receiving tight end by Bill Walsh after being named a consensus First-team All-American from Ricks College.  While at Stanford, Clark credited much of his development as a blocker to his coach Pat Morris. He received both athletic and academic honors while in college. He finished his professional career with 92 receptions, 909 yards receiving, and 4 touchdowns during the regular season. In addition, he caught two touchdowns in the 1998-99 playoff game against the Green Bay Packers prior to Terrell Owens's last second catch from Steve Young to defeat the Packers. Clark was named to the 1999 USA Today All-Joe Team. Injuries forced him into early retirement, in 2001.

Death
Clark died from a self inflicted gunshot on July 7, 2021.  He had experienced “chronic traumatic encephalopathy-like” symptoms prior to his suicide, later revealed in March 2022 to be CTE Stage III.

References

1972 births
2021 deaths
2021 suicides
People from Centerville, Utah
Players of American football from Utah
Place of death missing
American football tight ends
Stanford Cardinal football players
San Francisco 49ers players
American football players with chronic traumatic encephalopathy